Veton Tusha (born 29 December 2002) is a Kosovan professional footballer who plays as a centre-forward for Football Superleague of Kosovo club Ballkani.

Club career

Denizlispor
On 15 January 2021, Tusha signed his first professional contract with Super Lig side Denizlispor after agreeing to a three-and-a-half year deal and received squad number 25. His debut with Denizlispor came five days later against Galatasaray after coming on as a substitute at 46th minute in place of Hadi Sacko and scored his side's only goal during a 6–1 away deep defeat.

Termalica
On 18 February 2022, Tusha joined Ekstraklasa side Termalica, after agreeing to a one-and-a-half year deal. His debut with Termalica came a day later in a 0–0 home draw against Legia Warsaw after coming on as a substitute at 81st minute in place of Samuel Štefánik.

Ballkani
On 2 September 2022, Tusha signed a three-year contract with Football Superleague of Kosovo club Ballkani. Six days later, he was named as a Ballkani substitute for the first time in a 2022–23 UEFA Europa Conference League group stage match against CFR Cluj.

International career

Under-17
On 19 November 2017, Tusha was named as part of the Kosovo U17 squad for 2017 Aegean Mercedes Cup. A day later, he made his debut with Kosovo U17 in 2017 Aegean Mercedes Cup match against the host Turkey U17 after coming on as a substitute.

Under-19
On 7 November 2019, Tusha was named as part of the Kosovo U19 squad for 2020 UEFA European Under-19 Championship qualifications. Six days later, he made his debut with Kosovo U19 in a match against Russia U19 after coming on as a substitute at 60th minute in place of Adonis Aliu.

Under-21
On 15 March 2021, Tusha received a call-up from Kosovo U21 for the friendly matches against Qatar U23. Eleven days later, he made his debut with Kosovo U21 in first match against Qatar U23 after being named in the starting line-up.

Career statistics

Club

References

External links

2002 births
Living people
People from Kaçanik
Association football forwards
Kosovan footballers
Kosovo youth international footballers
Kosovo under-21 international footballers
Kosovan expatriate footballers
Kosovan expatriate sportspeople in Turkey
Kosovan expatriate sportspeople in Poland
Macedonian footballers
Macedonian expatriate footballers
Macedonian expatriate sportspeople in Turkey
Macedonian expatriate sportspeople in Poland
Macedonian people of Kosovan descent
Albanians in North Macedonia
Süper Lig players
Denizlispor footballers
Expatriate footballers in Poland
Ekstraklasa players
Bruk-Bet Termalica Nieciecza players

KF Ballkani players